The Macau Outstanding Athletes Election (Portuguese: Eleição dos Atletas Excepcionais de Macau) is organized by the  and by  to award athletes who have contributed to the success or development of Macau in sport. 80% of the vote is made by the institute committee and 20% is made by the general public. The election is held every two years.

Recipients

Honorary awards for athletes

Honorary awards for junior athletes

Honorary awards for teams of Macau

Most popular athletes

Most popular junior athletes

Honorary awards for coaches

Honorary praise award

References 

Orders, decorations, and medals of Macau